Theresa Lardi Awuni (born 2 January 1979) is a Ghanaian politician who is a member of the National Democratic Congress.  She is the member of parliament for the Okaikwei North Constituency in the Greater Accra region of Ghana.

Early life and education 
She hails from Winkongo in the Upper East Region. She obtained a Bachelor of Science degree in Project Management from the Ghana Institute of Management and Public Administration in 2018.

Career 
She worked at the National Disaster Management Organization of Ghana as a principal disaster control officer and at Langdi Enterprise (as proprietress).

Politics 
Awuni is a former Ghana Institute of Management and Public Administration TEIN Women's Commissioner.  TEIN (Tertiary Education Institutions Network) is the tertiary wing of the National Democratic Congress.

She is also a three-time Constituency Women's Organizer of Okaikwei North Constituency.

In August 2019, she contested for the National Democratic Congress primaries for Okaikwei North Constituency and won as the candidate to present the party in the December 2020 Elections. Awuni won by 342 votes out of a total of 866 ballots cast while her other contenders Richard Kwarshie Kudjordjie, Abdul Nasiru Abass and Malik Adama had 220 votes, 179 votes and 12 votes respectively.

She was elected member of parliament for the Okaikwei North Constituency in December 2020.She contested against the incumbent member of parliament Fuseini Issah of the New Patriotic Party and won after polling 29,281 votes representing 51.07% against his 27,242 votes representing 47.52%. She is one of the 40 women representing their respective constituencies in the 8th Parliament from 7 January 2021.

She is a member of the Subsidiary Legislation Committee and the Trade, Industry and Tourism Committee within the Ghanaian Parliament.

Personal life 
Awuni is a devout Christian.

References 

National Democratic Congress (Ghana) politicians
21st-century Ghanaian women politicians
Living people
Ghanaian MPs 2021–2025
1979 births
Ghana Institute of Management and Public Administration alumni